Anselmo López (April 21, 1934 – February 14, 2016) was one of the most important bandola llanera players in Venezuela. He is the creator of the Jalao (Spanish for "pull") technique, which applies a technique derived from the classical guitar to the bandola llanera. In the jalao, the thumb and index fingers hold the plectrum to pick the melody, while the nail of the index or middle finger, or sometimes the plectrum itself, is used to pluck harmonic notes in the chord of the melody on the adjacent strings. With this technique, Anselmo López popularized the bandola nationally and internationally. He recorded several albums.

Anselmo López, who also goes by the name of “el Rey de la Bandola” (The King of the Bandolas), breathed new life into the Bandola with his playing style.  He was the inventor of the “segundeo” technique, a special technique only applied only to the Bandola Llanera. 

La Escuela Anselmera (the Anselmo School) is now considered as a typical traditional style of Bandola playing.

Discography
1968 Viajando al Llano
1970 Raudales de mi Región
1972 Bandola Quitapesares
1973 Bandola Internacional
1974 Arpa y Bandola
1975 Cimarrón
1976 Esta es mi Bandola
1976 Bandola del Llano Adentro
1977 Lluvia en el Llano
1980 Folklore Puro
1981 Bandola de Chaparrito
1982 El Rebusco con Bandola
1982 Anselmo López Vol. 1
1982 Anselmo López Vol. 2
1982 La Cruz de Mayo
1982 Instrumentales Criollos
1983 Recio
1997 Clásicos de Oro
1999 16 Grandes e Inolvidables de Anselmo López Vol. 2
1999 La Mejor Bandola
2007 El Rey de la Bandola

See also 
Venezuelan music

References

External links 
Anselmo López Discography
Segundeo Technique by Anselmo López

1934 births
2016 deaths
People from Barinas (state)
Venezuelan bandola players
Venezuelan composers
Male composers
Venezuelan folk musicians